The 2020–21 Liga IV was the 79th season of the Liga IV, the fourth tier of the Romanian football league system. The season was initially postponed due to the high costs generated by COVID-19 pandemic, but on 7 April 2021, the Romanian Football Federation approved a new protocol for the amateur leagues, with lower costs. The county associations had only a month to play a blitzkrieg season, but only 24 leagues (out of 42) had a competition and announced a champion in time, three other county associations (Călărași, Giurgiu and Vrancea) organized a competition, but which ended after the deadline imposed by the FRF.

The promotion play-off will be played in two rounds. First round will be played between 6 winners of Liga IV (chosen randomly), consisting of 3 matches played on neutral ground. The second round will be played as a promotion/relegation play-off, between last two teams of each 2020–21 Liga III series (2X10) and the county leagues winners.

Preliminary Round 

|}

Promotion/relegation play-off 

|-
|colspan="3" style="background-color:#97DEFF"|Region 1
|colspan="2" style="background-color:#97DEFF"|
||w/o||w/o
||2–1||5–0
||2–0||2–1
|-
|colspan="3" style="background-color:#97DEFF"|Region 2
|colspan="2" style="background-color:#97DEFF"|
{{OneLegResult| Team Săgeata (BZ) ||2–5| (L3) Avântul Valea Mărului }}||1–3||1–2
||w/o||w/o
{{OneLegResult| Făurei (L3) ||2–2| (IL) Fetești }}||2–2||0–0
|-
|colspan="3" style="background-color:#97DEFF"|Region 3
|colspan="2" style="background-color:#97DEFF"|
||0–3||4–1
{{OneLegResult| Rapid Buzescu (TR) ||0–5| (L3) Recolta Gheorghe Doja }}||0–3||0–2
||1–1||2–2
|-
|colspan="3" style="background-color:#97DEFF"|Region 4
|colspan="2" style="background-color:#97DEFF"|
{{OneLegResult| Balotești (L3) ||0–6| (AG) Real Bradu }}||0–2||0–4
||3–1||3–1
{{OneLegResult| Băbeni (VL) ||3–11| (L3) Kids Tâmpa Brașov }}||3–4||0–7
|-
|colspan="3" style="background-color:#97DEFF"|Region 5
|colspan="2" style="background-color:#97DEFF"|
{{OneLegResult| Universitatea Craiova II (L3) ||1–3| (CS) Voința Lupac }}||1–0||0–3
{{OneLegResult| Dunărea Calafat (DJ) ||1–4| (L3) Progresul Ezeriș }}||1–1||0–3
||2–1||3–4
|-
|colspan="3" style="background-color:#97DEFF"|Region 6
|colspan="2" style="background-color:#97DEFF"|
{{OneLegResult| Industria Galda (L3) ||1–2| (TM) Pobeda Stár Bišnov}}||0–0||1–2
{{OneLegResult| Hermannstadt II (L3) ||4–5| (AR) Frontiera Curtici}}||1–2||3–3
||3–1||2–2
|-
|colspan="3" style="background-color:#97DEFF"|Region 7
|colspan="2" style="background-color:#97DEFF"|
{{OneLegResult| Rapid Jibou (SJ) ||4–7| (L3) Luceafărul Oradea}}||1–1||3–6
||3–0||5–4
||3–1||3–1
|}

County leagues

Arad County

Argeș County

Group A

Group B

Championship play-off

Semi-finals

Final 

|}
Real Bradu won the 2020–21 Liga IV Argeș and qualify for promotion play-off to Liga III.

Bacău County

Championship final  

Dinamo Bacău won the 2020–21 Liga IV Bacău and qualify for promotion play-off to Liga III.

Brașov County

Championship play-off

Buzău County

Championship final  
The championship final was played on 8 May 2021	 at Petrolul Stadium in Berca.

Team Săgeata won the 2020–21 Liga IV Buzău and qualify for promotion play-off to Liga III.

Caraș-Severin County

Championship final  
The championship final was played on 8 May 2021	 at Voința Stadium in Lupac.

Voința Lupac won the 2020–21 Liga IV Caraș-Severin and qualify for promotion play-off to Liga III.

Călărași County

Cluj County

Constanța County

Championship play-off

Third place match

Championship final  

Ovidiu won the 2020–21 Liga IV Constanța and qualify for promotion play-off to Liga III.

Dolj County

Championship play-off

Third place match

Championship final  

Dunărea Calafat won the 2020–21 Liga IV Dolj and qualify for promotion play-off to Liga III.

Giurgiu County

Zone I

Zone II

Championship play-off  
The championship play-off was played between the best two ranked teams in each zones. All matches was played at Dunărea-Port Stadium in Giurgiu on 12 June 2021 the semi-finals and on 20 June 2021 the final.

Semi-finals

Final 

Victoria Adunații-Copăceni won the 2020–21 Liga IV Giurgiu.

Hunedoara County

Final four  
The teams started the final four play-off with half of the points accumulated in the regular season.

5–7 place play-off  
The teams started the play-off with half of the points accumulated in the regular season.

8–10 place play-off  
The teams started the play-off with half of the points accumulated in the regular season.

Ialomița County

Ilfov County

Championship final  
The championship final played between the leader and the runner-up of the regular season. If the match ended in a draw, the high-seeded team will be declared winners.

Viitorul Domnești won the 2020–21 Liga IV Ilfov and qualify for promotion play-off to Liga III.

Maramureș County

Championship final  

Sighetu Marmației won the 2020–21 Liga IV Maramureș and qualify for promotion play-off to Liga III.

Mehedinți County

Championship play-off

Third place match

Championship final  

Viitorul Șimian won the 2020–21 Liga IV Mehedinți and qualify for promotion play-off to Liga III.

Mureș County

Serie 1

Serie 2

Championship play-off  
The matches from play-off was played in one leg on neutral grounds.

Semi-finals

Final 

Iernut won the 2020–21 Liga IV Mureș and qualify for promotion play-off to Liga III.

Prahova County

Championship final  
The championship final played between the leader and the runner-up of the regular season. If the match ended in a draw, the high-seeded team will be declared winners.

Petrolul 95 Ploiești won the 2020–21 Liga IV Prahova and qualify for promotion play-off to Liga III.

Satu Mare County 
Series A

Series B 

Championship play-off 
The matches from play-off was played in one leg on neutral grounds.
Semi-finals

Final

|}
Victoria Carei won the 2020–21 Liga IV Satu Mare and qualify for promotion play-off to Liga III.

Sălaj County

Championship final  
The championship final played between the leader and the runner-up of the regular season. If the match ended in a draw, the high-seeded team will be declared winners.

Rapid Jibou won the 2020–21 Liga IV Sălaj and qualify for promotion play-off to Liga III.

Sibiu County

Suceava County

Group A

Group B

Championship final  

Viitorul Liteni won the 2020–21 Liga IV Suceava and qualify for promotion play-off to Liga III.

Teleorman County

Championship play-off  
The championship final played between the leader and the runner-up of the regular season. If the match ended in a draw, the high-seeded team will be declared winners.

Rapid Buzescu won the 2020–21 Liga IV Teleorman and qualify for promotion play-off to Liga III.

Timiș County

Vaslui County

Vâlcea County

Championship final  
The championship final played between the leader and the runner-up of the regular season. If the match ended in a draw, the high-seeded team will be declared winners.

Băbeni won the 2020–21 Liga IV Vâlcea and qualify for promotion play-off to Liga III.

Vrancea County

Championship play-off

Third place match

Championship final  

Inizio Focșani won the 2020–21 Liga IV Vrancea.

References

External links
 FRF

Liga IV seasons
4
Romania